Cay Lembcke (15 December 1885 – 31 January 1965) was a co-founder of the Danish Boy Scouts Organization in 1910 and the National Socialist Workers' Party of Denmark in 1930. He was captain of the Danish Guard Hussars until his resignation in 1923, following public disagreement with the Danish government over budget cuts in the Danish defence.

Lembcke was co-founder of the Danish Boy Scouts Organization (Det Danske Spejderkorps). He wrote a Danish adaptation of Robert Baden-Powell's Scouting for Boys in December 1910, titled "Patrouilleøvelser for Drenge"  (Patrol exercises for Boys). He left the Danish Boy Scout movement in 1923, after many years of disagreement because of his fascist tendencies.

Following the success of the National Socialist German Workers' Party in the 1930 German federal election, Lembcke was the co-founder of National Socialist Workers' Party of Denmark (Danmarks National Socialistiske Arbejderparti) and the first leader of the party. After a disappointing 1932 Danish general election result, Lembcke was replaced as leader by Frits Clausen in July 1933.

References

External links
  Sondre Ljoså, "Alltid beredt til hva?", University of Oslo, 2007
  Per Biensø, "Cay Lembcke, Spejdersport og Fascisme, 1910-1923", Aalborg University, 2005

1885 births
1965 deaths
National Socialist Workers' Party of Denmark politicians
Scouting and Guiding in Denmark
Leaders of political parties in Denmark